Mahasweta Ray is an Indian actress and television personality who is known for her work in Odia films and soap operas. Her numerous accolades include record 8 Odisha State Film Awards.

Biography
Ray was born in an academic family (Rajkishore Ray was a writer and academic) and had had limited exposure to cinema before she started a career in film. She worked on a majority of the films by Sisir Mishra, including many box office successes. She married Sirish Routray, with whom she has a son, Rishi. Bengali films she worked on include Aranyer Adhikar (1998), Katha Chhilo (1994), Sajani Go Sajani (1991), Sujan Sakhi (1995) and Nyayachakra (1991). She won state awards for acting in Kaberi (1983), Pooja (1981), and Gouri (1979).

She is actively associated with the Oriya film industry, doing some character roles and some tele-serials.

Filmography

Chumki My Darling (2021)
Jaga Hatare Pagha (2015)
Lekhu Lekhu Lekhi Deli (2014)
Hata Dhari Chalutha (2013)
Mu Eka Tumara (2013)
Superstar (2013)
Target (2012)
Raja Jhia Sathe Heigala Bhaba (2011)
Kemiti a Bandhan (2010)
Tu Thile Mo Dara Kahaku (2007)
Mo Suna Pua (2003)
Sabata Maa (2000)
Bou (1998)
Gopa Re Badhhuchhi Kala Kanhei (1995)
Chamatkar (Sony TV) (1994)
Kula Nandan (1994)
Kothachilo (1994)
Akuha Katha (1994)
Suna Bhauja (1993)
Bhagya Hate Doro (1992)
Agni Sankat (1992)
Ghara Mora Swarga (1992)
Mukti Tirtha (1992)
Kandhei (1990)
Jaa Devi Sarva Bhuteshu (1989)
Panchu Pandav (1989)
Golamgiri (1987)
Bagula Baguli (1986)
Paka Kambal Pot Chhota (1986)
Grihalakshmi (1985)
Samay Bada Balwan (1985)
Dora (1984)
Hira Nila (1984)
Jaga Balia (1984)
Kaberi (1983)
Kalyani (1983)
Swapna Sagara (1983)
Ashanta Graha (1982)
Hisab Nikas (1982)
Akshi Trutiya (1981)
Pooja (1981)
Seeta Raati (1981)
Sei Sura (1981)
Tike Hasa Tike Luha (1981)
Baata Abaata (1980)
Danda Balunga (1980)
Jai Maa Mangala (1980)
Maa-o-Mamata (1980)
Gauri (1979)
Nijhum Rati Ra Saathi (1979)
Balidan (1978)
Janmadata (1978)
Jhilmil (1978)
Kabi Samrat Upendra Bhanja (1978)
Priyatama (1978)
Sankha Mahuri (1978)
Sati Ansuya (1978)
Pranam Kharedhu (22 SEP 1978)Ae Nuhen Kahani (1977)Hira Moti Manika (1976)Sesa Shrabana (1976)Jhumuka'' (1975)

See also
Prashanta Nanda
National Film Awards

References

External links

Orissa State Film Award Winners

1962 births
Living people
Indian film actresses
Actresses in Odia cinema
Actresses from Odisha
20th-century Indian actresses
21st-century Indian actresses
Ollywood
Bharatiya Janata Party politicians from Odisha